Danko Marinelli (born May 30, 1987 in Rijeka, SR Croatia, SFR Yugoslavia) is an alpine skier from Croatia. He competed for Croatia at the 2006 Olympics and the 2010 Olympics. His best result was a 32nd in the slalom in 2010.

References

External links
 
 

1987 births
Living people
Croatian male alpine skiers
Olympic alpine skiers of Croatia
Alpine skiers at the 2006 Winter Olympics
Alpine skiers at the 2010 Winter Olympics